Vengoor is a village in the Ernakulam district of Kerala, India. It is located in the Angamaly Municipality.

Vengoor stretches from double palam which is not double anymore to the culvert near shapumpadi bus stop. Vengoor has 2 schools, a church, one temple and two convents. Vengoor belongs to Angamaly municipality and it determines one of the boundary lines of the same.

Demographics 

According to the 2011 census of India, Vengoor has 2797 households. The literacy rate of the village is 86.88%.

References 

Villages in Kunnathunad taluk